Jun Byung-doo (Hangul: 전병두, Hanja: 全炳斗) (born October 14, 1984 in Busan, South Korea) is a South Korean left-handed starting pitcher who plays for the SK Wyverns of the KBO League.

Professional career 
Drafted by the Doosan Bears with the 1st pick in the second round of the 2003 KBO Draft, Jun made his pro debut on September 2, 2003.
In 2005, Jun was traded to the Kia Tigers for Daniel Rios, and had his statistically outstanding season as a setup man and closer, going 3-2 with 5 saves and a 3.00 ERA in 57 innings pitched. After the 2005 KBO season, he was called up to the South Korea national baseball team for the inaugural World Baseball Classic held in March 2006. At the 2006 WBC, he played an important role as a left-handed specialist, appearing in the last three games for the South Korean team.

In the 2006 KBO season, he pitched 101.1 innings as a starter and long reliever with 94 strikeouts.

In 2007, however, Jun spent much of his time on the disabled list because of elbow trouble.
	 
In the middle of the 2008 season, Jun was traded to the SK Wyverns. Sidelined by injuries, he only appeared in 10 games during the season, going 2-4 with a 4.64 ERA and 29 strikeouts in 33 innings pitched.

In 2009, Jun had the most productive season, establishing career-highs in almost every single pitching category. He was runner-up in ERA (3.11) behind Wyverns ace Kim Kwang-Hyun and fifth in strikeouts (136), going 8-4 with 8 saves. Jun became a fixture in the starting rotation until the All-Star break after being one of the Wyverns' most consistent pitchers in spring training, and appeared in games as a utility pitcher in the second half of the season. On May 23 against the Doosan Bears, Jun struck out 9 consecutive batters with a total of 13 strikeouts as a starter, falling one shy of Lee Dae-Jin's KBO record of 10 consecutive strikeouts.

External links
Profile and stats on the KBO official site

1984 births
Living people
South Korean baseball players
2006 World Baseball Classic players
Doosan Bears players
Kia Tigers players
SSG Landers players
Busan High School alumni
Sportspeople from Busan